Kentuctah Creek is a stream in the U.S. state of Mississippi. It is a tributary to Doaks Creek.

Kentuctah is a name derived from the Choctaw language purported to mean "beaver pond". A variant transliteration is "Kenwetah Creek".

References

Rivers of Mississippi
Rivers of Madison County, Mississippi
Mississippi placenames of Native American origin